Cherry Green or Chaureth Green is a hamlet in the civil parish of Broxted and the Uttlesford district of Essex, England.

Cherry Green contains nine Grade II listed buildings: three cottages, two houses, three farmhouses, and a barn.

References

External links 
 
 Essex cast iron guideposts in the Uttlesford District

Hamlets in Essex
Uttlesford